Mammillaria rettigiana is a species of plant in the family Cactaceae. It is endemic to Mexico. Its natural habitat is hot deserts. It is threatened by habitat loss.

References

rettigiana
Cacti of Mexico
Endemic flora of Mexico
North American desert flora
Vulnerable plants
Taxonomy articles created by Polbot